Und Die Scheiße Ändert Sich Immer (German for "And the Shit Is Always Changing") is the second album by Big Sir, which consists of Juan Alderete (The Mars Volta, Racer X), and Lisa Papineau (Air, M83).

Track listing
"Blutrausch (Smooth Interlude) – 3:15
"Rejoice The Rig" – 5:11
"The Freeways Of My Mind" – 5:17
"Song Bong Blue" – 0:59
"Hey Soldier" – 3:10
"Saticoy Street" – 3:28
"Cause That Shit's Too Evil (And She's Just A Gangsta Bitch)" – 4:38
"Get Off The B" – 3:00
"Saxophone" – 3:11
"Pelo De Elote" – 4:22
"I Lie Down" – 4:37
"Hammer On Pull Off" – 4:27
"Eastside Westside Blue" – 3:33
"Speedy's Rejoinder" – 3:50

Personnel
Juan Alderete – bass, chorus (1), backing vocals (2, 3), claps (2), clavinet (3, 8), Taurus pedals (3, 7), recording (4, 7), whistle (6), noise (10)
Lisa Papineau – vocals, tambourine (1, 9), Rod (1), claps (2, 9), Taurus pedals (3, 10), cowbell (3), synth (4, 7), shaker (5), recording (7, 8), Omnichord (9), noise (10), 4-tracking (11, 12)
Matthieu Lesenechal - Wurlitzer & Mellotron (1), chorus (1), Rhodes (2, 5, 7), guitar (2, 13), claps (2), accordion (5), recording & mix (5, 7, 11), synth (8)
Bruce Bouillet - drum programming (3, 6, 8, 10, 11), vocals (3), recording & mix (3, 5, 6, 7, 8, 10, 11), clavinet (6, 8), cymbal overdubs (10), noise (10), beats & loops (12)
Jonathan Hischke – bass (1, 2, 7, 13)
Adrián Terrazas-González – saxophone & bass clarinet (7), flute (11)
Money Mark – Hammond organ (11)
Scott Seiver – drums (1, 2, 13), glockenspiel (2, 5)
Bron Tieman – chorus (1)
Robert Carranza – record & mix (1, 2, 11, 13)
Isabelle Sainte-Rose – cello (5)
Troy Zeigler – drums (5, 7, 11), claps (9)
Manny Nieto – recording (5, 7, 11)
Mickey Petralia – mix (7, 8, 11), claps (9), recording (9)
Robin Lynn – mix (8)
Brian Miller – Rhodes (9)
Tyler Crowley – guitar (9)
Speedy – vocals (14)
Lawrence – drum programming & recording (14)

Miscellanea
The title is German for "And the Shit Is Always Changing".
Blutrausch is German for "Bloodlust".

References

2006 albums
Gold Standard Laboratories albums
Albums produced by Mickey Petralia
Big Sir (band) albums
Experimental pop albums